Alistair Asher (born 14 October 1980) is an English former footballer who played in the Football League for Mansfield Town.

References

English footballers
English Football League players
1980 births
Living people
Mansfield Town F.C. players
Halifax Town A.F.C. players
People from Leicester
Hucknall Town F.C. players
Association football defenders